Hup or HUP may refer to:

Music 
 Hup (album), a 1989 album by The Wonder Stuff
 "Hüp", a single by Turkish singer Tarkan

Organizations 
 Hanoi University of Pharmacy, in Vietnam
 Harvard University Press, in Cambridge, Massachusetts
 Howard University Press, in Washington, D.C.
 Hospital of the University of Pennsylvania, in Philadelphia

Other uses 
 Hup people, an Amazonian indigenous people in Brazil and Colombia
 Hup language a language of Brazil and Colombia
 hup, the ISO 639 code for the Hupa language of California, United States
 Heisenberg's uncertainty principle
 Hungarian Unix Portal
 Humphrey Park railway station, in England
 HUP Retriever, a US Navy utility helicopter
 SIGHUP, a Unix signal